Charles Stevenson (October 13, 1887 – July 4, 1943) was an American film actor of the silent era. He appeared in 136 films between 1914 and 1925. He was born in Sacramento, California, and died in Palo Alto, California.

Selected filmography

 Luke, the Candy Cut-Up (1916)
 Luke Pipes the Pippins (1916)
 Luke's Double (1916)
 Luke's Late Lunchers (1916)
 Luke Laughs Last (1916)
 Luke's Fatal Flivver (1916)
 Luke's Society Mixup (1916)
 Luke Rides Roughshod (1916)
 Luke, Crystal Gazer (1916)
 Luke's Lost Lamb (1916)
 Luke Does the Midway (1916)
 Luke Joins the Navy (1916)
 Luke and the Mermaids (1916)
 Luke's Speedy Club Life (1916)
 Luke and the Bang-Tails (1916)
 Luke, the Chauffeur (1916)
 Luke's Preparedness Preparations (1916)
 Luke, the Gladiator (1916)
 Luke, Patient Provider (1916)
 Luke's Newsie Knockout (1916)
 Luke's Movie Muddle (1916)
 Luke, Rank Impersonator (1916)
 Luke's Fireworks Fizzle (1916)
 Luke Locates the Loot (1916)
 Luke's Shattered Sleep (1916)
 Luke's Lost Liberty (1917)
 Lonesome Luke, Lawyer (1917)
 Luke Wins Ye Ladye Faire (1917)
 Lonesome Luke's Lively Life (1917)
 Lonesome Luke on Tin Can Alley (1917)
 Lonesome Luke's Honeymoon (1917)
 Stop! Luke! Listen! (1917)
 Lonesome Luke, Messenger (1917)
 Lonesome Luke's Wild Women (1917)
 Lonesome Luke Loses Patients (1917)
 Pinched (1917)
 Birds of a Feather (1917)
 From Laramie to London (1917)
 Love, Laughs and Lather (1917)
 Clubs Are Trump (1917)
 All Aboard (1917)
 We Never Sleep (1917)
 Move On (1917)
 Step Lively (1917)
 The Tip (1918)
 On the Jump (1918)
 Follow the Crowd (1918)
 It's a Wild Life (1918)
 Hey There! (1918)
 The Non-Stop Kid (1918)
 Two-Gun Gussie (1918)
 The City Slicker (1918)
 Sic 'Em, Towser (1918)
 Somewhere in Turkey (1918)
 Are Crooks Dishonest? (1918)
 An Ozark Romance (1918)
 Kicking the Germ Out of Germany (1918)
 That's Him (1918)
 Bride and Gloom (1918)
 Two Scrambled (1918)
 Bees in His Bonnet (1918)
 Do You Love Your Wife? (1919)
 Ask Father (1919)
 Ring Up the Curtain (1919)
 Spring Fever (1919)
 Just Neighbors (1919)
 Be My Wife (1919)
 The Rajah (1919)
 He Leads, Others Follow (1919)
 Soft Money (1919)
 Count the Votes (1919)
 Pay Your Dues (1919)
 His Only Father (1919)
 Bumping Into Broadway (1919)
 Captain Kidd's Kids (1919)
 From Hand to Mouth (1919)
 His Royal Slyness (1920)
 Haunted Spooks (1920)
 An Eastern Westerner (1920)
 High and Dizzy (1920)
 Get Out and Get Under (1920)
 Number, Please? (1920)
 Now or Never (1921)
 A Sailor-Made Man (1921)
 Safety Last! (1923)
 Under Two Jags (1923)
 Kill or Cure (1923)
 Gas and Air (1923)
 Short Orders (1923)
 A Man About Town (1923)
 The Whole Truth (1923)
 Scorching Sands (1923)
 Pied Piper Malone (1924)
 Hot Water (1924)
 Isn't Life Terrible? (1925)

References

External links

1887 births
1943 deaths
American male film actors
American male silent film actors
Male actors from Sacramento, California
20th-century American male actors